Milverton is a village and civil parish in Somerset, England, situated in the valley of the River Tone  west of Taunton in the Somerset West and Taunton district. The village has a population of 1,438. The parish includes the hamlet of Preston Bowyer.

It has one public house, The Globe (The White Hart public house closed in March 2008), a convenience store, a piano dealership and workshop, a post office, a taxi service and a hairdresser.

History

The name of the village is believed to come from the Old English and mean settlement at the mill ford. There is evidence of a mill within the parish from the Domesday Book of 1086. These referred to the site of the Town Mills on Hillfarrence Brook.

Neolithic flint arrowheads have been found to the west of the village and Bronze Age axe heads were discovered when the bypass, which opened in 1975, was being built.

Just before the Norman Conquest, Milverton was granted by Queen Edith to Bishop Giso of Wells, but this was reversed by William the Conqueror. The manor was then united with Torrington in Devon passing in 1212 to William Briwere. The parish was part of the Milverton Hundred,

The Old House is a Grade II* listed building dating from the late 14th and early 15th century. It was built as a residence for the archdeacon of Taunton and was once the home of Thomas Cranmer. While the house was being renovated in the early 21st century a Tudor wall painting of Henry VIII was discovered underneath the plaster and is the only one of its kind in a domestic dwelling. It has been speculated that there is a secret message in the image., which has been dated to around 1541.

In 1708 there was a fire which destroyed 13 properties. Trade was largely based on cloth manufacture and in 1819 Lamech Swift established a silk throwing factory which employed up to 300 women and children.

The village used to have a station on the Devon and Somerset Railway, which closed in 1966.

Governance
The parish council has responsibility for local issues, including setting an annual precept (local rate) to cover the council's operating costs and producing annual accounts for public scrutiny. The parish council evaluates local planning applications and works with the local police, district council officers, and neighbourhood watch groups on matters of crime, security, and traffic. The parish council's role also includes initiating projects for the maintenance and repair of parish facilities, as well as consulting with the district council on the maintenance, repair, and improvement of highways, drainage, footpaths, public transport, and street cleaning. Conservation matters (including trees and listed buildings) and environmental issues are also the responsibility of the council.

The village falls within the non-metropolitan district of Somerset West and Taunton, which was established on 1 April 2019. It was previously in the district of Taunton Deane, which was formed on 1 April 1974 under the Local Government Act 1972, and part of Wellington Rural District before that. The district council is responsible for local planning and building control, local roads, council housing, environmental health, markets and fairs, refuse collection and recycling, cemeteries and crematoria, leisure services, parks, and tourism.

Somerset County Council is responsible for running the largest and most expensive local services such as education, social services, libraries, main roads, public transport, policing and fire services, trading standards, waste disposal and strategic planning.

There is an electoral ward in the name of 'Milverton and North Deane'. Milverton is the most populous village in the ward but this stretches north to Lydeard St Lawrence. The total population at the 2011 Census was 2,208.

It is also part of the Taunton Deane county constituency represented in the House of Commons of the Parliament of the United Kingdom. It elects one Member of Parliament (MP) by the first past the post system of election.

Religious sites

The Church of St Michael dates from the 13th century, on the site of an even earlier chapel, and has been designated as a Grade I listed building.

Notable residents

Milverton was the birthplace of Thomas Young (1773–1829), an English polymath who contributed to the scientific understanding of vision, light, solid mechanics, energy, physiology, and Egyptology.

John Francis Ebdon (1876–1952) was an English cricketer born in the village. Another cricketer, Australian-born Herbert Oxley Hopkins (1895–1972) died in the village.

References

External links

 Village website

Villages in Taunton Deane
Civil parishes in Somerset